Kota Chambal Tigers, commonly abbreviated as KCT, is franchise cricket team representing Kota, Rajasthan in the Rajasthan Rajwada Cricket League (RCL). It is one of the six founding member teams of RCL 2016. The franchise is owned by Plum Sports . Kota Chambal Tigers are currently the crowned champions as they won the inaugural edition of RCL in 2016.

Franchise 
Kota Chambal Tigers (KCT) is a premier franchise of Rajasthan Rajwada Cricket League (RCL) owned by Plum Sports Holdings (P) Limited. At the inaugural season of Rajasthan Rajwada Cricket League (RCL), Kota Chambal Tigers was one of the six teams that were formed. Mr. Aakarshit Madaan and Mr. Abhishek Bajaj are the founders of Plum Sports Holdings (P) Limited and thus the owners of the KCT franchise.

Logo 
The logo of Kota Chambal Tigers has a Tiger within a crest having Lime Green and Navy Blue colours. The reason for having a tiger in the logo is because of the presence of Tigers in and around the Chambal Region of Rajasthan and denotation of Tigers as a symbol of Strength, Energy and Courage - which is reflection of players of Kota Chambal Tigers. The colors - Lime and Navy Blue is representative of the Jersey colours of Kota Chambal Tigers.

Home ground 

International Stadium is a cricket ground in Kota, Rajasthan. The ground as established in 1974 with name of Municipal Stadium. The ground regularly hosts Ranji matches for Rajasthan cricket team. Till date the ground has hosted six first-class matches and a List A matches.

The ground hosted RCL T20 2016 from 16 February to 24 February with six teams from all across Rajasthan and 18 matches, in total.

Performance

Season 1 
In the first season of Rajasthan Rajwada Cricket League (RCL) 2016, Kota Chambal Tigers started their campaign on 18 February 2016 against Jaipur Pink City Royals which was held on a stalemate, for which Super Over method was adopted where Kota Chambal Tigers emerged victorious. Dishant Yagnik was awarded Man of the Match for his quick runs and brilliant captaincy under pressure.

In the league stage, Kota Chambal Tigers cruised ahead of all others in first four matches with brilliant performances from Dishant Yagnik, Rajesh Bishnoi Sr., Divya Pratap Singh Hada, Rituraj Singh, Mahipal Lomror among others. The team hit a speed-breaker with their fifth and final match of RCL 2016 league stage matches, where Jodhpur Jodhana Royals beat Kota at their homeground. Nevertheless, they qualified for Knockout rounds with a peak position on the table.

Kota Chambal Tigers was set out to have a semi-finals with Ajmer Meru Warriors where with help of an explosive start from Divya Pratap Singh Hada and a masterful half-century from Dishant Yagnik helped Kota Chambal Tigers attain a total of 191 runs at the end of 20 overs. Ajmer could never capitalise over the required Run Rate and fell short by 10 runs with help of a great all-around bowling performance from bowlers of Kota Chambal Tigers. Chandrapal Singh was awarded Man of the Match award for his brilliant all-round performance with bat and ball.

The final was played between Kota Chambal Tigers and Jodhpur Jodhana Royals at International Stadium, Kota on 23 February 2016. Kota won the toss and elected to bat and put up a respectable total of 141 with middle-order pitching in a hundred runs. Jodhpur got on to a solid start but failed to capitalise as wickets kept falling at regular intervals and ultimately required run-rate was too much for them to handle. Ultimately, they were bowled out in 19 overs with 18 runs short of Kota's score. Gaurav Sharma took four wickets, with Naresh Nama picking up three, both having an economy of less than three runs per over. Gaurav Sharma was awarded Man of the Match for his all-round performance with both Bat as well as Ball by Mohd. Kaif and Mr. Amin Pathan, Chairman of Rajasthan Rajwada Cricket League. Kota won the match as well as Rajasthan Rajwada T-20 Cricket League 2016 Inaugural Edition.

The first season of Rajasthan Rajwada Cricket League was a Live telecast on NEO Sports and NEO Prime.

Season 2 

The launch of second season took place at Tivoli Gardens, Chattarpur, Delhi on 29 July 2016. RCL also unveiled the two new teams to be playing in Rajasthan Rajwada Cricket League 2017 and the jerseys of all the eight teams that will be participating. The guests in attendance were Kainaat Arora, Sh. Om Birla (Member of Parliament - Kota Bundi) and Sh. Amin Pathan, Minister of State, Rajasthan Government and Siddharth Trivedi.

On 5 December 2016, Kota unveiled Farveez Maharoof as Kota Chambal Tigers' mentor and a new addition to their squad. The unveiling of rest of the squad followed, which included Dishant Yagnik, Nathu Singh, Mahipal Lomror and Salman F. Khan among others.

The stage is all set for the second season of RCL to be played at International Cricket Stadium, Kota, Rajasthan from 6 February to 24 February 2017.

Squad

The Tigers

References 

2016 establishments in Rajasthan
Cricket in Rajasthan
Cricket teams in India
Cricket clubs established in 2016